Robert Walter Kasten Jr. (born June 19, 1942) is an American Republican politician from the state of Wisconsin who served as a U.S. Representative from 1975 to 1979 and as a United States Senator from 1981 to 1993.

Background
Kasten was born in Milwaukee, Wisconsin. He attended the Milwaukee Country Day School before graduating in 1960 from The Choate School (now Choate Rosemary Hall) in Wallingford, Connecticut, in 1964 from the University of Arizona in Tucson, and received his M.B.A. from the Columbia Business School in 1966. He served in the Wisconsin Air National Guard from 1966 to 1972.

Elected office

Kasten was elected to the Wisconsin State Senate in 1972. In 1974, he was elected to the House of Representatives after defeating incumbent Glenn R. Davis in a Republican primary election.  He was reelected in 1976. He ran for Governor of Wisconsin in 1978 , but lost the Republican nomination to Lee S. Dreyfus.

Kasten ran for the United States Senate in 1980 and narrowly defeated Democrat and incumbent Senator Gaylord Nelson. The victory was propelled in part by the popularity of Ronald Reagan at the top of the Republican ticket. In the Senate, Kasten was an outspoken conservative. He was the first Republican to represent Wisconsin in the U.S. Senate since Alexander Wiley left office in 1963 after being defeated in 1962 by Nelson.

In 1985, Kasten was arrested and charged with driving under the influence after a District of Columbia police officer observed him running a red light and driving on the wrong side of the road. The charges were later dropped.

In 1986, Kasten narrowly defeated Democrat Ed Garvey to win a second term after a very bitter campaign, one that was characterized by personal attacks and is remembered as one of the nastiest elections in Wisconsin history. Kasten was defeated by Democratic state Senator Russ Feingold in 1992.

Kasten voted in favor of the bill establishing Martin Luther King Jr. Day as a federal holiday and the Civil Rights Restoration Act of 1987 (as well as to override President Reagan's veto). Kasten voted in favor of the nominations of Robert Bork and Clarence Thomas to the U.S. Supreme Court.

After the Senate
Since 1993, he has been President of Kasten & Company, a consulting firm. In July 2007, Kasten joined the presidential campaign of Republican Rudy Giuliani as a foreign policy adviser. He chaired Giuliani's Wisconsin campaign, along with former U.S. Representative Scott Klug and former State Senator Cathy Stepp.

After Giuliani dropped out, Kasten endorsed his close friend and former Senate colleague John McCain. In April 2016, Kasten endorsed Republican frontrunner Donald Trump for president in 2016, becoming part of Trump's foreign policy advisory team.

Electoral history

Cultural references
Writer Mike Baron named a recurring character in his Wisconsin-based comic book Badger after Kasten, then Wisconsin's junior senator. The character, a peg-legged, vampire-hunting pig named "Senator Bob Kasten", made several appearances in the series. A student political party on the University of Wisconsin Madison campus satirically named themselves the "Bob Kasten School of Driving" (a reference to his DUI arrest); it won the campus-wide elections in 1986 and 1987.

References

External links

 

1942 births
Living people
American Episcopalians
Republican Party United States senators from Wisconsin
Republican Party Wisconsin state senators
Choate Rosemary Hall alumni
Columbia Business School alumni
University of Arizona alumni
Politicians from Milwaukee
Military personnel from Milwaukee
People from Wallingford, Connecticut
Republican Party members of the United States House of Representatives from Wisconsin
Members of Congress who became lobbyists